Thangjam Nandakishor Singh (1956/1957 – 5 May 2021) was an Indian politician from Manipur and served as a member of the Legislative Assembly of Manipur, as the Nationalist Congress Party candidate in the constituency Khetrigao from 2007 till 2012.

Singh died from COVID-19 in May 2021, aged 64.

References

1950s births
2021 deaths
Nationalist Congress Party politicians from Manipur
Manipur MLAs 2007–2012
Deaths from the COVID-19 pandemic in India
Manipur politicians
People from Imphal East district